Macroglossum nemesis is a moth of the  family Sphingidae. It is known from Sulawesi.

The length of the forewings is 23–24 mm. It is similar to Macroglossum corythus corythus and Macroglossum sylvia, but the forewings are longer and have a more varied pattern.

References

Macroglossum
Moths described in 1998